The 2021 San Marino and Rimini Riviera motorcycle Grand Prix (officially known as the Gran Premio Octo di San Marino e della Riviera di Rimini) was the fourteenth round of the 2021 Grand Prix motorcycle racing season and the sixth round of the 2021 MotoE World Cup, which represented the end of the season for the MotoE class. It was held at the Misano World Circuit Marco Simoncelli in Misano Adriatico on 19 September 2021.

In this race, the Sky VR46 Team showed off a special fuschia colored livery.

Qualifying

MotoGP

Race

MotoGP

Moto2

Moto3

 Gabriel Rodrigo withdrew from the event due to a broken left humerus suffered at the Aragon Grand Prix.
 Yuki Kunii was excluded from the event due to causing a collision with Alberto Surra in third free practice.

MotoE

Race 1

All bikes manufactured by Energica.

Race 2

Alessandro Zaccone suffered a pelvis fracture during race 1 and was declared unfit for race 2.
André Pires was declared unfit for race 2 due to a shoulder injury.
All bikes manufactured by Energica.

Championship standings after the race
Below are the standings for the top five riders, constructors, and teams after the round.

MotoGP

Riders' Championship standings

Constructors' Championship standings

Teams' Championship standings

Moto2

Riders' Championship standings

Constructors' Championship standings

Teams' Championship standings

Moto3

Riders' Championship standings

Constructors' Championship standings

Teams' Championship standings

MotoE

References

Notes

External links

San Marino
San Marino and Rimini Riviera motorcycle Grand Prix
San Marino and Rimini Riviera motorcycle Grand Prix
San Marino and Rimini Riviera motorcycle Grand Prix